1892–93 in Scottish football was the 20th season of competitive football in Scotland and the third season of the Scottish Football League.

League competitions

Scottish Football League 

Celtic became Scottish Football League champions for the first time.

Other honours

Cup honours

National

County

Non-league honours

Senior

Scotland national team

Key:
 (H) = Home match
 (A) = Away match
 BHC = British Home Championship

Other national teams

Scottish League XI

See also
 1892–93 Rangers F.C. season

Notes

References

 
Seasons in Scottish football